Mezhova Raion was a raion (district) of Dnipropetrovsk Oblast, southeastern-central Ukraine. Its administrative centre was located at the urban-type settlement of Mezhova. The raion was abolished on 18 July 2020 as part of the administrative reform of Ukraine, which reduced the number of raions of Dnipropetrovsk Oblast to seven. The area of Mezhova Raion was merged into Synelnykove Raion.

At the time of disestablishment, the raion consisted of three hromadas:
 Mezhova settlement hromada with the administration in Mezhova;
 Novopavlivka rural hromada with the administration in the selo of Novopavlivka;
 Slovianka rural hromada with the administration in the selo of Slovianka.

Notable People 

Ivan Chernoknizhny  (1890-1928) – anarchist in the Revolutionary Insurgent Army of Ukraine (RIAU) under Nestor Makhno was native to the region.

References

Former raions of Dnipropetrovsk Oblast
1923 establishments in Ukraine
Ukrainian raions abolished during the 2020 administrative reform